Pius Olakunle Osunyikanmi is the current director general of Directorate of Technical Aid Corps of Nigeria, since August 15, 2013.

He was first appointed by President Goodluck Ebele Jonathan in 2013 and re-appointed by President Muhammadu Buhari in 2018.

Technical Aid Corps is a Nigerian federal government agency responsible for the sharing of Nigeria's know-how and expertise with other African, Caribbean and Pacific countries (ACP).

Early life and education 

Pius Osunyikanmi was born on 3 August 1971, to the family of Pa Christopher Kehinde Osunyikanmi and Madam Esther Osunyikanmi in Ile Oluji, Ondo State. 
He graduated from Orere Grammar School, Ile Oluji, Ondo State in 1989. He went on to Ondo State University, now Ekiti State University, obtaining a Bachelor of Science degree in Political Science in 1997.

He holds Masters and Doctorate degrees in Political Science from the University of Ibadan in 2001 and Adekunle Ajasin University, 
Akungba Akoko in 2008 respectively.

Family 
Pius is married to Adebukola, a professor of political science and he has three children.

Political career 
Osunyikanmi was appointed the Special Adviser on International Relations to Nigeria's President Goodluck Ebele Jonathan in 2011 and he served between July 2011 and August 2013.

He was Ondo State Commissioner of Education from June 2010 to July 2011.

As Commissioner of Education, he established and implemented the Education Quality Assurance Agency (EQAA) which addressed the falling standard of education in the state which led him to order the closure of some private schools over poor standards and facilities.

Before serving as Commissioner of education, Osunyikanmi had served as the special adviser to the Governor of Ondo State on Intergovernmental affairs and multilateral relations between March 2009 and June 2010,
Special Assistant to the Minister, Federal Ministry of Housing and Urban Development (2005 - 2006), Special Assistant to the Secretary of Government, Ondo State (2003 - 2005) and Special Assistant to the Commissioner of Health, Ondo State (1999 - 2002).

He was at some point interested in running for the governorship of Ondo state and was among those nominated by a youth group to succeed Olusegun Mimiko
but defected from the People's Democratic Party (PDP) to the All Progressives Congress (APC) in 2015 when he could not get Olusegun Mimiko to support his ambition after the latter threw his weight behind his Attorney General and Commissioner for Justice, Eyitayo Jegede to succeed him as Governor.

Shortly before his defection from the PDP, he had publicly disowned Olusegun Mimiko who he served under as Commissioner for Education, Special Adviser On Intergovernmental Affairs and Multilateral relations, and Special Assistant due to political differences.

References 

Politicians from Ondo State
Living people
1971 births
Jonathan administration personnel
21st-century Nigerian politicians
All Progressives Congress politicians
Heads of government agencies of Nigeria